Amandla may refer to:

Amandla (power), a Xhosa and Zulu word meaning "power"
Amandla (album), a 1989 jazz album by Miles Davis
Amandla (magazine), a magazine launched in South Africa in June 2007 by Amandla Publishers
Amandla!: A Revolution in Four-Part Harmony, a 2002 documentary film depicting the role music played in the activist struggle against South African apartheid
 Amandla (film), 2021, on Netflix
 Amandla Stenberg, an American actress and voice actress
 Amandla, an American music group fronted by singer/songwriter Claude Coleman Jr.

See also
Amandala, a Belizean newspaper